William Elwyn Dunstan (born January 3, 1949 in Oakland, California) was an American football defensive lineman in the National Football League for the San Francisco 49ers, New York Jets, Philadelphia Eagles, Buffalo Bills, and the Los Angeles Rams.  He played college football at Utah State University.

1949 births
Living people
Players of American football from Oakland, California
Utah State Aggies football players
American football defensive tackles
Philadelphia Eagles players
Buffalo Bills players
Los Angeles Rams players